Mămăligă is a porridge made out of yellow maize flour, traditional in Romania, Moldova and West Ukraine. Poles from the Lviv area also prepare this traditional dish. It is also a traditional dish in Thessaly and Fthiotis, Greece, and is also common in the Black Sea region of Turkey. In Italy, Switzerland, Slovenia, Croatia, and many other countries, this dish is known as polenta.

History 

Historically a peasant food, it was often used as a substitute for bread or even as a staple food in the poor rural areas. However, in the last decades it has emerged as an upscale dish available in the finest restaurants.

Roman influence 

Historically, porridge is the oldest form of consumption of grains in the whole of humanity, long before the appearance of bread. Originally, the seeds used to prepare slurries were very diverse as millet or einkorn.

Before the introduction of maize in Europe in the 16th century, mămăligă had been made with millet flour, known to the Romans as pulmentum.

Corn's introduction in Romania 

Maize was introduced into Spain by Hernán Cortés from Mexico in 1530 and spread in Europe in the 16th century. Maize (called corn in the United States) requires a good amount of heat and humidity. The Danube Valley is one of Europe's regions ideal for growing maize.

A Hungarian scholar documented the arrival of corn in Timișoara, Banat region, 1692. In Transylvania, maize is also called 'cucuruz', which could imply a connection between Transylvanian and Serbian merchants, kukuruz being a Slavic word. Some assume it was either Șerban Cantacuzino or Constantin Mavrocordat who introduced corn in Wallachia, Maria Theresa in Transylvania and Constantine Ducas in Moldavia where it is called păpușoi.
Mămăligă of millet would have been replaced gradually by mămăligă made of corn. The corn then become an important food, especially in the fight against famine which prevailed in the 17th and 18th centuries.

Historian Nicolae Iorga noted that farmers of the Romanian Principalities had grown corn since the early-to-mid-17th century.

Etienne Ignace Raicevich, a Republic of Ragusa Ragusan consul of the Napoleonic Empire to Bucharest in the third quarter of the 18th century, wrote that corn was introduced only da poco tempo (recently).

In an edition of Larousse, the French dictionary, in the Danubian principalities, the existence of corn-based mămăligă dates from 1873.  mamaligma s. f. Boiled corn meal.

Preparation 

Traditionally, mămăligă is cooked by boiling water, salt and cornmeal in a special-shaped cast iron pot called ceaun or tuci. When cooked peasant-style and used as a bread substitute, mămăligă is supposed to be much thicker than the regular Italian polenta to the point that it can be cut in slices, like bread. When cooked for other purposes, mămăligă can be much softer, sometimes almost to the consistency of porridge. Because mămăligă sticks to metal surfaces, a piece of sewing thread is used to cut it into slices instead of a knife; it can then be eaten by holding it with the hand, just like bread.

Mămăligă is a versatile food: various recipes of mămăligă-based dishes may include milk, butter, various types of cheese, eggs, sausages (usually fried, grilled or oven-roasted), bacon, mushrooms, ham, fish etc. Mămăligă is a fat-free, cholesterol-free, high-fiber food. It can be used as a healthy alternative to more refined carbohydrates such as white bread, pasta or hulled rice.

Serving mămăligă 

Mămăligă is often served with sour cream and cheese on the side (mămăligă cu brânză și smântână) or crushed in a bowl of hot milk (mămăligă cu lapte). Sometimes slices of mămăligă are pan-fried in oil or in lard, the result being a sort of corn pone.

Also, the traditional meal is served with meat, usually pork called tocana or fried fish, and mujdei, a garlic-and-oil sauce.

Similar dishes 

Since mămăligă can be used as an alternative for bread in many Romanian and Moldovan dishes, there are quite a few which are either based on mămăligă, or include it as an ingredient or side dish. Arguably, the most popular of them is sarmale (a type of cabbage roll)/grapevine roll) with mămăligă.

Another very popular Romanian dish based on mămăligă is called bulz, and consists of mămăligă with cheese and butter and roasted in the oven.

Balmoș (sometimes spelled balmuș) is another mămăligă-like traditional Romanian dish, but is more elaborate. Unlike mămăligă (where the cornmeal is boiled in water) when making balmoș the cornmeal must be boiled in sheep milk. Other ingredients, such as butter, sour cream, telemea (a type of feta cheese), caș (a type of fresh curdled ewe cheese without whey, which is sometimes called "green cheese" in English), urdă (similar to ricotta), etc., are added to the mixture at certain times during the cooking process. It is a specialty dish of old Romanian shepherds, and nowadays very few people still know how to make a proper balmoș.

Trivia 

 A gruel made of cornmeal, water, milk, butter, salt and sugar is called in Romanian cir de mămăligă. If it is exceedingly thin and made only of cornmeal, water and salt it is called mieșniță or terci.
 Depending on the context, mălai is the Romanian word for either:
 The Romanian version of cornmeal
 Any type of cereals or edible grains (much like the English corn), but this use of the word is becoming increasingly obsolete
 Money, as a slang term.
 Corn flour (i.e., maize flour) is called in Romanian mălai or făină de porumb.
 Before the arrival of maize in Eastern Europe, mămăligă was made of millet flour. Long lost, millet mămăligă is now again fashionable in western Europe.
 Mămăligă is mentioned multiple times in Aaron Lebedeff's Yiddish novelty song Rumania, Rumania. In Yiddish it is spelled מאַמאַליגע.

In literature 

In Chapter One of Dracula by Bram Stoker is the commentary, "I had for breakfast more paprika, and a sort of porridge of maize flour which they said was ‘mamaliga’, and egg-plant stuffed with forcemeat, a very excellent dish, which they call ‘impletata’”.

Similar dishes 

Mămăligă is similar to the Italian polenta, which is also very popular in Brazil.

Cornmeal mush is its analogue common in some regions of the United States and grits in the southern regions.

Its analogue in Serbia and Bulgaria is called kačamak and is served mainly with white brine cheese or pork rind (fried pieces of pork fat with parts of the skin).

In Bosnia and Herzegovina, Croatia (also polenta or palenta), Serbia (also kačamak) and in Montenegro the dish is mainly called pura. In North Macedonia it is called bakrdan  and in Slovenia polenta.

Hungarians call it puliszka.

The Transylvanian Saxons call it 'palukes' in their traditional cuisine.

In Turkey it is also called mamaliga, or kaçamak. Another similar dish, called kuymak or muhlama, is among the typical dishes of the Black Sea Region, although now popular in all the greater cities where there are many regional restaurants.

Broccoliga is a variant of Mămăligă featuring a broccoli-polenta mixture suffused with cheddar cheese and herbs.

Known by different names in local languages ( abysta,  mamrys,  ghomi,  zhuran-khudar, Chechen: ah'ar-hudar/zhuran-hudar, Nogai: мамырза mamyrza,   sera), it is also widespread in Caucasian cuisines.

There is also a distinct similarity to cou-cou (as it is known in the Barbados), or fungi (as it is known in Antigua and Barbuda and other Leeward Islands in the Caribbean Sea).

This dish is eaten widely across Africa, often with white maize flour instead of yellow, where it has different local names:

Gallery

See also 

 Bulz
 Cocoloși
 Cornbread
 List of maize dishes
 List of porridges
 Tocană – a Romanian stew traditionally served with mămăligă

References

External links 

 

Moldovan dishes
Porridges
Romanian dishes
Staple foods
Maize dishes
National dishes
Peasant food
Aromanians in Romania